Ngan Chau can refer to 3 islands in Hong Kong:

 Ngan Chau, an islet off Peng Chau
 Round Island aka. Ngan Chau in Southern District
 Flat Island aka. Ngan Chau, near the north shore of Sai Kung Peninsula